Our Solar System is an album by the rock group Half Japanese, released in 1984 by Iridescence.

It was reissued by Drag City in 2000.

Critical reception
The album received mixed to fair reviews.  The Spin Alternative Record Guide wrote that "the playing is often too drowsy" and that "David's continued fear/objectification of women grows less cute by the minute."

Track listing

Personnel
David Fair
Jad Fair

References 

1984 albums
Half Japanese albums